Philoponella vicina is a species of spider that does not use venom (characteristic of Uloboridae), but instead wraps its prey in hundreds of metres of spider silk to crush it to death. The spider then goes on to regurgitate digestive fluid into the shroud, then consuming the pre-digested liquid.

Stabilimenta occur in more than half of constructed orbs, most commonly with two lines pointing up and down from the spider. If only one radius is constructed, it is mostly constructed above the spider. Some spiders build resting webs that are not used for prey capture. These also sometimes feature stabilimenta, suggesting that prey capture plays no role in its construction. When disturbed, the spider flees up one of the stabilimentum lines.

Distribution
The spider is found natively from Mexico to Costa Rica.

Footnotes

References
 Platnick, Norman I. (2007). The world spider catalog, version 8.0. American Museum of Natural History.
 Eberhard, William G.; Barrantes, Gilbert & Weng, Ju-Li (2006). "Tie them up tight: wrapping by Philoponella vicina spiders breaks, compresses and sometimes kills their prey". Naturwissenschaften 95(5): 251-254.  — HTML abstract
 Eberhard, William G. (2006). "Stabilimenta of Philoponella vicina (Araneae: Uloboridae) and Gasteracantha cancriformis (Araneae: Araneidae): Evidence Against a Prey Attractant Function". Biotropica 39(2): 216-220. 

Uloboridae
Spiders of North America
Spiders of Central America
Spiders described in 1899